Françoise M'Pika (born 21 May 1956) is a Congolese sprinter. She competed in the women's 100 metres at the 1984 Summer Olympics.

References

External links
 

1956 births
Living people
Athletes (track and field) at the 1984 Summer Olympics
Republic of the Congo female sprinters
Olympic athletes of the Republic of the Congo
Place of birth missing (living people)
Olympic female sprinters